The Liga Nacional de Fútbol de Guatemala Apertura 2007 is the 88th season of the Liga Nacional de Fútbol de Guatemala, Guatemala's premier football league. It began on July 28 and finished on December 15.

Promotion and relegation

Mictlán was relegated at the end of the 2006–07 season and was replaced by Malacateco who was promoted from the Primera División.

Participating clubs

Final standings

Top scorers

Final Update: December 26, 2007
Source:Prensa Libre

Results

Playoffs

Apertura Tournament Champion
Jalapa as tournament champion qualified to the 2008–09 CONCACAF Champions League.

Relegation
There is no relegation after the Apertura.

References

External links
rsssf

1
Gua
Liga Nacional de Fútbol de Guatemala seasons